The 2020-21 Sacred Heart Pioneers men's ice hockey season was the 28th season of play for the program, the 23rd at the Division I level, and the 18th season in the Atlantic Hockey conference. The Pioneers represented Sacred Heart University and were coached by C. J. Marottolo, in his 12th season.

The start of the college hockey season was delayed due to the ongoing coronavirus pandemic. As a result, Sacred Heart's first scheduled game was in late-November as opposed to early-October, which was the norm.

Season
As a result of the ongoing COVID-19 pandemic the entire college ice hockey season was delayed. Because the NCAA had previously announced that all winter sports athletes would retain whatever eligibility they possessed through at least the following year, none of Sacred Heart's players would lose a season of play. However, the NCAA also approved a change in its transfer regulations that would allow players to transfer and play immediately rather than having to sit out a season, as the rules previously required.

Coming off of the best season in the history of the program, Sacred Heart saw a bit of a decline. The team finished 6–10–2 but the record does not reflect the difficulties that the team faced during the season. The Pioneers were not alone in suffering through COVID-related cancellations, but Sacred Heart saw their opposition increase in difficulty as a result. Many of their cancelled games were against weaker teams and the Pioneers added a set of games with Quinnipiac, a team that was ranked throughout the season. Additionally, Sacred Heart played Army (another ranked team) six times during the season, a full third of their games. While SHU kept most of those matches close they did lose to the Black Knights 5 times during the season, which accounts for half of the team's losses. It would be difficult to come away with any conclusions about Sacred Heart's season other than the team had to weather several storms during the year.

Departures

Recruiting

Roster
.

Standings

Schedule and Results

|-
!colspan=12 style=";" | Regular Season

|-
!colspan=12 style=";" | 

|- align="center" bgcolor="#e0e0e0"
|colspan=12|Sacred Heart lost series 0–2

Scoring statistics

Goaltending statistics

Rankings

USCHO did not release a poll in week 20.

Awards and honors

References

Sacred Heart Pioneers men's ice hockey seasons
Sacred Heart Pioneers
Sacred Heart Pioneers
Sacred Heart Pioneers
Sacred Heart Pioneers men's ice hockey
Sacred Heart Pioneers men's ice hockey